Armageddon Expo is a New Zealand owned and operated pop culture convention that holds multiple events around New Zealand in cities including Auckland, Wellington, Tauranga and Christchurch. The event, run by Beyond Reality Media Premier Event Management, has been running continuously since 1995. It has evolved from its roots of comics and trading cards to showcase computer and video gaming, animation, film and television, cosplay, comics, live wrestling, and retailers selling pop-culture merchandise.

The convention hosts celebrity guests from the worlds of movies, TV shows, animation, cosplay, YouTube, comics and gaming. Event attendees can meet guests, purchase autographs and photo opportunities as well as watch panels featuring the guests. Armageddon Expo is one of the largest public conventions held in New Zealand.

History
Armageddon began in Auckland, New Zealand on the weekend of 2 December 1995, at the Avondale Raceway. In 1997, the expo added a Wellington event; In 1999, Armageddon did their first Melbourne event, Armageddon held events, in Australia sporadically, over several years but stopped hosting events in Australia in 2016. In 2007, the first Christchurch Armageddon event was held; Armageddon has also hosted events in other cities in New Zealand including Hamilton, Manukau, and Dunedin.

2020, will be Armageddon's 25th year of operation with shows in Wellington, Christchurch, Tauranga and Auckland planned.

Highlights
Current show events include:
Celebrity Guest Panels, autograph and photo sessions.
The Cosplay Contest.
Exclusive Screenings
Trivia Contests
Cosplay Parade
E-Sports 
Gaming and Card Tournaments

Armageddon hosts a variety of stalls run by companies from around NZ and internationally, with merchandise including comics, gaming, trading cards, anime, steampunk and memorabilia sales. At each event, there are numerous NZ and overseas comic creators and artists also selling their products.

Venues and guest appearances

1995–1997
1995 (2–3 December) – Avondale Raceway, Auckland
1996 (25 August) – Freemans Bay Community Centre, Auckland
1997 (9 March) – Freemans Bay Community Centre, Auckland
1997 (17 August) – Freemans Bay Community Centre, Auckland
1997 (24 August) – Victoria University, Wellington

1998
21–22 March – Alexander Raceway, Auckland
Comic Guests: Kurt Busiek, Mark Waid, Devin Grayson

28–29 March – Wellington Raceway, Wellington
Comic Guests: Kurt Busiek, Mark Waid, Devin Grayson

3–4 October – Aotea Centre, Auckland
Comic Guests: Joe Kelly, Steven Seagle, Chris Bachalo

1999
29–30 May – Aotea Centre, Auckland
Comic Guests: Warren Ellis, Grant Morrison 
TV/Movie Guests: Claudia Christian (Babylon 5), Chase Masterson (Star Trek: Deep Space Nine)

5–6 June – Melbourne Expo Centre, Melbourne, Australia 
Comic Guests: Warren Ellis, Grant Morrison 
TV/Movie Guests: Claudia Christian (Babylon 5), Chase Masterson (Star Trek: Deep Space Nine), Frazer Hines (Doctor Who)

2000
18–19 March – Aotea Centre, Auckland
Comic Guests: Arthur Adams, Joyce Chin , Jeph Loeb 
TV/Movie Guests: Jeremy Bulloch (Star Wars), Lani Tupu (Farscape),

2001
10–11 February – Aotea Centre, Auckland
Comic Guests: Brian Michael Bendis, Walter Simonson, Louise Simonson, Diana Schutz
Animation Guests: Sean Schemmel & Christopher Sabat (Dragonball Z)
TV/Movie Guests: Teryl Rothery, Don S Davis, Peter Williams (actor) (Stargate SG-1) Virginia Hey (Farscape), Colin Baker, Katy Manning (Doctor Who), Ted Raimi, Kevin Smith (Xena: Warrior Princess)

Invitational event: Buffy The Vampire Slayer – Aotea Centre, Auckland
James Marsters (Spike)
Emma Caulfield (Anya Jenkins)
Brian Thompson (Luke and The Judge)

15–16 September – Michael Fowler Centre, Wellington
Comic Guests: Roy Thomas 
Animation Guests: Sean Schemmel (Dragonball Z)
TV/Movie Guests: Wayne Pygram (Farscape), Marjean Holden (Crusade (TV series))
Musical Guests: Che Fu

2002
12–14 April – Aotea Centre, Auckland
Comic Guests: Mark Millar, Frank Quitely, David W. Mack 
Animation Guests: Veronica Taylor (Pokémon), Stephanie Nadolny (Dragonball Z)
TV and Movie Guests: Claudia Black Wayne Pygram, Jonathan Hardy, Lani Tupu (Farscape), J. G. Hertzler, Robert O'Reilly, Tim Russ (Star Trek), Jason Carter (Babylon 5), Yvonne Craig (Batgirl), Peter Mayhew (Star Wars), Robert Leeshock (Earth: Final Conflict), Marjean Holden Steven Grives  (Beastmaster).
Musical Guests: Che Fu

23–24 November – Michael Fowler Centre, Wellington
Comic Guests: Bradley Kahl and Christian Gossett (Team Red Star)
Animation Guests: Mariah Martin (Amazing Nurse Nanako), Kyle Hebert (Dragonball Z)
TV and Movie Guests: Sandi Finlay (Star Wars: Episode II – Attack of the Clones), Amanda Tapping, Teryl Rothery, Don S. Davis (Stargate SG-1)
Musical Guest: Salmonella Dub

2003
12–14 April – Aotea Centre, Auckland
Comic Guests: John Cassaday, Mark Bagley, Christian Gossett
Animation Guests: Sean Schemmel (Dragonball Z), Debi Derryberry (Jimmy Neutron)
TV and Movie Guests: Mira Furlan (Babylon 5), Gil Gerard, Erin Gray (Buck Rogers in the 25th Century), Brent Stait (Andromeda), Anthony Simcoe (Farscape), Tony Amendola (Stargate SG1), Kenny Baker (Star Wars), Robert Picardo (Star Trek: Voyager)
 
20–22 September – Michael Fowler Centre, Wellington
Comic Guests: Mark Bagley, Christian Gossett
Animation Guests: Kazuko Tadano, Hiromi Matushita, Christopher Sabat (Dragonball Z), Veronica Taylor (Pokémon), Darren Dunstan (Yu-Gi-Oh!), Jonathan Ross (Yu-Gi-Oh)
TV and Movie Guests: Peter Mayhew (Star Wars), David Prowse (Star Wars), Garrett Wang (Star Trek: Voyager)

2004
16–18 April – Aotea Centre, Auckland 
Comic Guests: Alex Maleev, Marc Silvestri, Brian Michael Bendis
Animation Guests: Eric Vale (Dragonball Z), Wayne Grayson (Yu-Gi-Oh), Megan Hollingshead (Pokémon), David Kaye (Transformers Armada)
TV and Movie Guests: John Rhys-Davies, Bruce Hopkins (The Lord of the Rings), Mark Ferguson, Lawrence Makoare, George Takei, Anthony Montgomery (Star Trek), Corin Nemec (Stargate SG-1), Xenia Seeberg (Lexx)

25–26 September – Queens Wharf Events Centre, Wellington
Comic Guest: Stuart Immonen, David Finch
Animation Guests: Stephanie Nadolny (Dragonball GT), Dan Green, Wayne Grayson (Yu-Gi-Oh!), Joshua Seth (Duel Masters/Digimon), 
TV and Movie Guests: John Rhys-Davies, Sean Astin, Andy Serkis, Thomas Robins, Sarah McLeod, Jed Brophy (The Lord of the Rings), Cirroc Lofton, Penny Johnson Jerald (Star Trek: Deep Space Nine)

2005
16–17 April – Queens Wharf Events Centre, Wellington
Comic Guests: Scott Lobdell 
Animation Guests: Amy Birnbaum, Jonathan Ross (Yu-Gi-Oh!), Milton Lawrence (Duel Masters), Sean Schemmel (Dragonball Z),
TV and Movie Guests: Connor Trinneer (Star Trek: Enterprise), Ray Park (Star Wars/X-Men), Daniel Logan (Star Wars), Devon Murray (Harry Potter), Raelee Hill, Rebecca Riggs (Farscape)

22–24 October – Aotea Centre, Auckland (10th Anniversary)
Comic Guests:Christian Gossett, Mark Waid, Michael Turner, Francis Manapul
Animation Guests:Joshua Seth (Duel Masters), Dan Green (Yu-Gi-Oh!), Sonny Strait (Dragonball Z)
TV and Movie Guests: Gates McFadden (Star Trek: The Next Generation), John Rhys-Davies (The Lord of the Rings), Richard Hatch (Battlestar Galactica), Torri Higginson, Rainbow Sun Francks (Stargate Atlantis), Cliff Simon (Stargate SG-1), Dean Haglund (The X-Files), Julie Caitlin Brown, Robin Atkin Downes (Babylon 5), Nicole DeBoer (The Dead Zone), Jay Laga'aia (Star Wars: Episode II – Attack of the Clones)

2006
29–30 April – Queens Wharf Events Centre, Wellington
Comic Guests: Geoff Johns, Phil Jimenez.
Animation Guests:Mike McFarland, Sean Schemmel (Dragonball Z), Rodger Bumpass (SpongeBob SquarePants), Brian Beacock (Battle B Daman)
TV and Movie Guests:John Schneider (The Dukes of Hazzard / Smallville), John Billingsley (Star Trek: Enterprise), Claudia Christian (Babylon 5), Jewel Staite (Firefly/Serenity)

21–23 October – Aotea Centre, Auckland
Comic Guests:Arthur Suydam, Gary Frank
Animation Guests:Kevin Conroy(Batman: The Animated Series), Darren Dunstan (Yu-Gi-Oh!), Jennifer Hale (Powerpuff Girls), Vic Mignogna (Fullmetal Alchemist), Steve Blum (Cowboy Bebop)
TV and Movie Guests: Rachel Luttrell(Stargate Atlantis), David Nykl(Stargate Atlantis), Colin Cunningham, Tony Amendola (Stargate SG-1), Summer Glau (Firefly/Serenity), Mira Furlan (Lost), Clare Kramer (Buffy the Vampire Slayer/Bring It On), Tom Lenk (Buffy the Vampire Slayer), Kevin Weisman (Alias)

2007
14–15 April – Christchurch Convention Centre, Christchurch
Comic Guests: Brian K. Vaughan, Jimmy Cheung 
Animation Guests: Maile Flanagan (Naruto), Susan Eisenberg (Justice League), Crispin Freeman (Hellsing), Carolyn Lawrence (SpongeBob SquarePants)
TV and Movie Guests: Avery Brooks (Star Trek: Deep Space Nine), John Rhys-Davies (The Lord of the Rings), Don S. Davis (Stargate SG-1)

21–22 April – TSB Arena – Wellington
Comic Guests: Brian K. Vaughan, Jimmy Cheung
Animation Guests:Susan Eisenberg (Justice League), Crispin Freeman (Hellsing), Carolyn Lawrence (SpongeBob SquarePants), Maile Flanagan, Yuri Lowenthal, Tara Platt (Naruto)
TV and Movie Guests: Billy Dee Williams (Star Wars), Doug Jones (Hellboy/Fantastic 4), Aaron Douglas (Battlestar Galactica), John Rhys-Davies (The Lord of the Rings), Don S. Davis (Stargate SG-1)

19 August – A Day with the Doctor (Doctor Who convention) – Auckland 
TV and Movie Guests: Sylvester McCoy (the Seventh Doctor), David Weston, William Gaunt

13–14 October – Melbourne Exhibition Centre, Melbourne, Australia
Comic Guests: Amanda Conner, Jimmy Palmiotti, Gail Simone, Nicola Scott
Animation Guests: Billy West (Futurama), Richard Horvitz (Invader Zim), Stephanie Sheh (Naruto), Neil Kaplan (Transformers), Rodger Bumpass (SpongeBob SquarePants), Rino Romano (Sailor Moon)
TV and Movie Guests: Alan Tudyk (Serenity), John Wesley Shipp (The Flash), Jane Badler (V), Connor Trinneer (Star Trek: Enterprise), Peter Woodward (Crusade), Joe Flanigan (Stargate Atlantis), Chris Rankin (Harry Potter)
Wrestling Guests: Rob Van Dam, Jasmine St. Clair, Sabu (WWE)

20–22 October – Aotea Centre, Auckland 
Comic Guests:Amanda Conner, Jimmy Palmiotti, Gail Simone, Nicola Scott 
Animation Guests:Billy West (Futurama), Richard Horvitz (Invader Zim), Stephanie Sheh (Naruto), Neil Kaplan (Transformers), Rodger Bumpass (SpongeBob SquarePants), Rino Romano (Sailor Moon)
TV and Movie Guests:Connor Trinneer (Star Trek: Enterprise), Christopher Judge (Stargate SG-1), Ellen Muth (Dead Like Me), Peter Woodward (Crusade), Joe Flanigan (Stargate Atlantis), Chris Rankin (Harry Potter)
Wrestling Guests:Rob Van Dam, Christy Hemme (WWE), Raven (TNA)

2008
19–20 April – TSB Arena – Wellington
Animation Guests: Hynden Walch (Teen Titans)
TV and Movie Guests: Christopher Judge, Alexis Cruz (Stargate SG-1), Matthew John Armstrong (Heroes), Tracy Scoggins (Babylon 5)

26–27 April – Christchurch Convention Centre – Christchurch
Comic Guests: Jim Lee, JJ Kirby , Sandra Hope , Livio Ramondelli , Joel Gomez, Eddie Nunez , Beth Sotelo
Animation Guests: Nalini Krishan (Star Wars Episode II: Attack of the Clones), Johnny Yong Bosch (Bleach), Grey DeLisle (Avatar: The Last Airbender), Dave Wittenberg (Naruto), Crispin Freeman (Hellsing)
TV and Movie Guests: Christopher Judge, Alexis Cruz (Stargate SG-1), Matthew John Armstrong (Heroes), Tracy Scoggins (Babylon 5), David Hewlett, Andee Frizzell, Kavan Smith, Gary Jones (Stargate Atlantis), Doug Jones (Hellboy), Margot Kidder (Superman Film Series) Ernie Hudson (Ghostbusters)
Wrestling Guest: The Sandman

25–27 October – Auckland Armageddon, Aotea Centre
Comic Guests: 
Jim Lee, JJ Kirby, Sandra Hope, Livio Ramondelli, Joel Gomez, Eddie Nunez and Beth Sotelo
Animation Guests:(BLEACH) Johnny Bosche AVATAR Grey Delisle NARUTO Dave Wittenberg HELLSING Crispin Freeman
TV/Movie Guests: STARGATE ATLANTIS David Hewlett, Andee Frizzell, Kavan Smith STARGATE SG1 Gary Jones HELLBOY Doug Jones SUPERMAN 1–4 Margot Kidder GHOSTBUSTERS Ernie Hudson
Wrestling Star The Sandman

2009
28–29 March – Christchurch Convention Centre, Christchurch 

Darick Robertson (comic book artist), Queenie Chan (manga writer/artist), 
Bill Farmer (voice actor/voice of Goofy), 
Peter Davison (Doctor Who), Michael Hurst (Hercules), Kevin Sorbo (Hercules/Andromeda/Meet the Spartans), Michael Winslow (Police Academy), Mark Strickson, (Doctor Who – Turlough), Jonny Fairplay (Survivor/Fear Factor/TNA), Sam J. Jones (Flash Gordon), Michelle Deighton (America's Next Top Model), 
Colleen Clinkenbeard (voice actor; One Piece/Fullmetal Alchemist), Greg Cipes (voice actor; Ben 10 Alien Force/Teen Titans), Brina Palencia (voice actor; Black Cat/One Piece/Fullmetal Alchemist).

4–5 April – TSB Arena, Wellington

Comics Darick Robertson (comic book artist), Queenie Chan (manga writer/artist), 
TV movies Peter Davison (Doctor Who), Michael Hurst (Hercules), Kevin Sorbo (Hercules/Andromeda/Meet the Spartans), Michael Winslow (Police Academy), Mark Strickson, (Doctor Who – Turlough), Jonny Fairplay (Survivor/Fear Factor/TNA), Sam J. Jones (Flash Gordon), Michelle Deighton (America's Next Top Model), 
Animation Colleen Clinkenbeard (voice actor; One Piece/Fullmetal Alchemist), Greg Cipes (voice actor; Ben 10 Alien Force/Teen Titans), Brina Palencia (voice actor; Black Cat/One Piece/Fullmetal Alchemist), Bill Farmer (voice actor/voice of Goofy) .

17–18 October – Melbourne Exhibition Centre, Melbourne

Joe Flanigan, Jason Momoa, Paul McGillion (Stargate Atlantis); Noah Grey-Cabey (Heroes); Cameron Bright, Christopher Heyerdahl, Bronson Pelletier (New Moon); Gigi Edgley (Farscape); 
Seth Green, Matthew Senreich, Tom Root (Robot Chicken); Greg Cipes (Teen Titans/Ben 10 Alien Force); Travis Willingham (Fullmetal Alchemist); Laura Bailey (Soul Eater); Sean Schemmel (Dragonball Z); Dante Basco, Olivia Hack (Avatar); Peter David (comic book writer), Nicola Scott (comic book artist), Greg Rucka (comic book writer), Matthew Clark, Bill Sienkiewicz (comic book artist)

24–26 October – ASB Showgrounds, Auckland

Joe Flanigan, Jason Momoa, Paul McGillion (Stargate Atlantis); Bronson Pelletier (New Moon); Gigi Edgley (Farscape); 
Seth Green, Matthew Senreich, Tom Root (Robot Chicken); Craig Horner, Craig Parker, Tabrett Bethell, Mark Beesley, Bridget Regan (Legend of the Seeker); Michael Winslow (Police Academy); Greg Cipes (Teen Titans/Ben 10 Alien Force); Travis Willingham (Fullmetal Alchemist); Laura Bailey (Soul Eater); Sean Schemmel (Dragonball Z); Dante Basco, Olivia Hack (Avatar); Steve Downes (Halo); Peter David (comic book writer), Greg Rucka (comic book writer), Matthew Clark, Bill Sienkiewicz (comic book artist)

2010
27/28 March 2010, Christchurch Convention Centre

Celebrity guests included Michael Winslow and Marion Ramsey Police Academy, James Kyson Lee (Heroes), Dominic Keating and John Billingsley (Star Trek: Enterprise), Bonita Friedericy (Chuck), Paul McGann (Doctor Who), René Auberjonois (Star Trek: Deep Space Nine), Chaske Spencer (The Twilight Saga: New Moon). 
Animation Guests included Steve Blum (Wolverine and the X-Men), Tom Gibis (Naruto), Michael McConnohie (Warcraft) and (Vampire Hunter D) and Melodee Spevack (Digimon). 
Comic Guests – Christian Gossett, Michael Allred, Francis Manapul and Nicola Scott. 
Author Guest – Robert Rankin.

2–4 April 2010, TSB Bank Arena, queens wharf, Wellington

Celebrity guests included Michael Winslow and Marion Ramsey Police Academy, James Kyson Lee (Heroes), Dominic Keating and John Billingsley (Star Trek: Enterprise), Bonita Friedericy (Chuck), Paul McGann (Doctor Who), René Auberjonois (Star Trek: Deep Space Nine), Chaske Spencer (The Twilight Saga: New Moon). 
Animation Guests included Steve Blum (Wolverine and the X-Men), Tom Gibis (Naruto), Michael McConnohie (Warcraft) and (Vampire Hunter D) and Melodee Spevack (Digimon). 
Comic Guests – Christian Gossett, Michael Allred, Francis Manapul and Nicola Scott. 
Author Guest – Robert Rankin.

June 2010, Castle Complex Otago University, Dunedin. NZ Anime convention,

Animation guest, Johnny Yong Bosch

16/17 October – Melbourne, Melbourne exhibition centre,

celebrity guests included Ben Browder (Farscape) and (Stargate SG-1), Michael Shanks (Stargate SG-1), Juliet Landau (Buffy the Vampire Slayer), Michelle Forbes (Battlestar Galactica and True Blood), Paul McGann, Sylvester McCoy, Sophie Aldred Doctor Who, Jerri Manthey, Jonny Fairplay (Survivor) David Faustino Married... with Children, Michael Biehn The Terminator and Aliens, Torri Higginson (Stargate Atlantis), Claudia Christian (Babylon 5), Lloyd Kaufman TROMA FILMS, Bruce Hopkins *LOTRS and Miracle Laurie DOLLHOUSE. 
Animation Guests included Bill Farmer DISNEY, Mela Lee VAMPIRE KNIGHT, Vic Mignogna Fullmetal Alchemist, John DiMaggio FUTURAMA and James Tucker WB ANIMATION. 
Comic Guests included Daniel Way, Darick Robertson, Lar Desousa, Rya Sohmer and Georges Jeanty.

23–25 October – Auckland, ASB Showground's (Fifteenth anniversary event!)

Celebrity guests included Michael Shanks (Stargate SG1), Paul McGann, Sylvester McCoy, Sophie Aldred (DOCTOR WHO), Jerri Manthey, Jonny Fairplay (Survivor) David Faustino Married... with Children, Michael Biehn (TERMINATOR)and (ALIENS), Torri Higginson (Stargate Atlantis), Claudia Christian (Babylon 5), Lloyd Kaufman *(TROMA FILMS) and Miracle Laurie (DOLLHOUSE). 
Animation Guests included Bill Farmer DISNEY, Mela Lee (VASMPIRE KNIGHT), Vic Mignogna (FULL METAL ALCHEMIST), John DiMaggio (Futurama) and ***James Tucker WB ANIMATION. 
Comic Guests – Daniel Way, Darick Robertson, Lar Desousa, Rya Sohmer, Georges Jeanty and Nicola Scott

2011
26/27 February – Sydney showgrounds, the dome, Sydney, Australia

Guests Included Patricia Tallman (Babylon 5); Renee O'Connor, Hudson Leick (Xena: Warrior Princess); David Anders, (Heroes); Lance Henriksen; John Rhys-Davies (The Lord of the Rings); Laura Vandervoort (Smallville); James Clement, Ami Cusack (Survivor); Ryan Robbins; Colin Cunningham (Stargate SG-1); Rainbow Sun Francks, David Hewlett (Stargate Atlantis); Karen Allen; Christopher Heyerdahl

5/6 March – Adelaide, Royal Adelaide Showgrounds, Australia 

Guests Included Patricia Tallman (Babylon 5); Renee O'Connor, Hudson Leick (Xena: Warrior Princess); David Anders, (Heroes); Lance Henriksen; John Rhys-Davies (The Lord of the Rings); Laura Vandervoort (Smallville); James Clement, Ami Cusack (Survivor); Ryan Robbins; Colin Cunningham (Stargate SG-1); Rainbow Sun Francks, David Hewlett (Stargate Atlantis); Karen Allen; Christopher Heyerdahl

2/3 April – Christchurch Convention Center, Christchurch, New Zealand 

POSTPONED- Due to 2011 Christchurch earthquake – Venue was inside the CBD Red Zone for most of 2011
and was demolished in 2012 due to extensive damage.

9/10 April – TSB Arena, Wellington, New Zealand 

Guests Included... John Rhys-Davies (The Lord of the Rings), Colin Baker, John Leeson (Doctor Who), Katee Sackhoff (Battlestar Galactica) Kristanna Loken (Terminator 3: Rise of the Machines). 
Comic Guests – Jimmy Palmiotti and Amanda Conner. Animation Guests – Paul Eiding Ben 10, Johnny Yong Bosch (Bleach), Michael Sinterniklaas (The Venture Bros.).

4/5 June – NZ Anime convention – Dunedin, New Zealand

Guests Included animation Guests Kristi Reed and Kari Wahlgren

2/3 July – Christchurch, Addington Raceway (previously Christchurch Convention Center)

Local celebrity guests were the Almighty Johnsons Ben Barrington, Emmett Skilton, Tim Balme and Jared Turner.

22/23 October – Melbourne, Australia

Guests Included Comic Creators Rob Guillory, Fred Van Lente And Frank Cho. 
Animation Voice Actors Were Kevin Conroy, Kyle Hebert, Paul Eiding, Scott Mccord And Steve Blum. 
Celebrity Guests Were Adrian Paul (Highlander), Agam Darshi (Sanctuary) Alaina Huffman Sg U Amanda Tapping (Stargate/Sanctuary) Callum Blue (Smallville) Jeff Lewis (The Guild) Kelly Donovan (Buffy the Vampire Slayer), Lance Guest and Catherine Mary Stewart (The Last Starfighter) Tom Braidwood, Dean Haglund And Bruce Harwood (The Lone Gunmen) Louise Jameson Doctor Who, Mark Ryan (Transformers), Mark Sheppard (Supernatural/Dr Who), W. Morgan Sheppard (Babylon 5 & Doctor Who), Nicholas Brendon (Buffy the Vampire Slayer), Robert Picardo (Star Trek: Voyager/Atlantis), Robin Dunne (Sanctuary), Sandeep Parikh (The Guild) And Sylvester McCoy Doctor Who.

28–31 October – Auckland, New Zealand (First Four Day Event)

Guests Included... Comic Creators Rob Guillory, Fred Van Lente And Frank Cho. 
Animation Voice Actors Kevin Conroy, Kyle Hebert, Paul Eiding, Scott Mccord And Steve Blum. 
Celebrity Guests Adrian Paul (Highlander) Agam Darshi (Sanctuary) Alaina Huffman Sg U Amanda Tapping (Stargate/Sanctuary), Jeff Lewis (The Guild) Kelly Donovan (Buffy the Vampire Slayer), Louise Jameson (Dr Who), Mark Ryan (Transformers), Mark Sheppard (Supernatural/Dr Who), W. Morgan Sheppard (Babylon 5/Dr Who), Nicholas Brendon (Buffy the Vampire Slayer), Sandeep Parikh (The Guild) And Sylvester McCoy (Doctor Who).

2012
14–15 April Hamilton, New Zealand

Guests included...Comic creators Dave Johnson and Ron Marz. 
Animation voice actors Brian Beacock (BATTLE B-DAMAN) Vic Mignogna (FULL METAL ALCHEMIST) and Dave Wittenberg (NARUTO). 
Celebrity guests Bronson Pelletier and Tinsel Korey (TWILIGHT), John Levene (DOCTOR WHO), Julie McNiven (SUPERNATURAL), Paul McGillion (STARGATE ATLANTIS) Teryl Rothery (STARGATE SG1) and ALMIGHTY JOHNSON STARS Emmett Skilton (Axl), Jared Turner (Ty) & Ben Barrington (Olaf).

21–22 April Wellington, New Zealand

Guests included...Comic creators Dave Johnson, Carlo Pagulayan and Ron Marz. 
Animation voice actors Brian Beacock (BATTLE B-DAMAN) Vic Mignogna (FULL METAL ALCHEMIST) and Dave Wittenberg (NARUTO). 
Celebrity guests Bronson Pelletier and Tinsel Korey (TWILIGHT), John Levene (DOCTOR WHO), Julie McNiven (SUPERNATURAL), Paul McGillion (STARGATE ATLANTIS) Teryl Rothery (STARGATE SG1) and ALMIGHTY JOHNSON STARS Emmett Skilton (Axl), Jared Turner (Ty) & Ben Barrington (Olaf) and Dean O'Gorman (Anders)

30 June–1 July – Christchurch, The Stables, Addington Raceway

Guests included Callum Blue (Smallville) Sylvester McCoy (Doctor Who) Christopher Paolini (Author Inheritance Saga) and Colleen Clinkenbeard (Anime guest One Piece)

12–14 October – Melbourne exhibition centre

Guests included, Bob Layton and Ian Churchill, 
Animation Guests: Kristi Reed (Anime director), Mela Lee (Vampire Knight) Johnny Yong Bosch(Bleach), Charles Mario (Mario Games), Lex Lang (Multiple anime star), Sandy Fox (Multiple anime star), Susan Eisenberg (JLU), Marianne Miller and Martin Billany (Yugioh Abridged), Yaya Han (Cosplay guest), 
Wrestling guest: Bushwhacker Luke, 
Acting guests: Aldis Hodge (Leverage), Aron Eisenberg (Star Trek DS9), Bruce Boxleitner (Babylon 5), Christopher Heyerdahl(Hell on Wheels), Christopher Judge (Stargate sg1), Cindy Morgan (TRON), Finn Jones and Miltos Yerolemou (Game of Thrones), George Lazenby (James Bond), Jim Beaver(Supernatural), Karl Urban (Judge Dredd), Mark Pellegrino (Supernatural), Martin Klebba(Pirates of the Caribbean), Rachel Grant (Die Another Day), Sebastian Roche (Vampire Diaries), Terry Molloy (Classic Doctor Who)

19–22 October – Auckland, ASB Showgrounds

Guests included, 
Comic Guests – Bob Layton, Harvey Tolibao and Ian Churchill, 
Animation Guests – Kristi Reed (Anime director), Mela Lee (Vampire Knight) Johnny Yong Bosch (Bleach), Charles Mario (Mario Games), Lex Lang (Multiple anime star), Sandy Fox (Multiple anime star), Susan Eisenberg (JLU), Marianne Miller and Martin Billany (Yugioh Abridged), 
Wrestling guest – Bushwhacker Luke. 
Acting guests: Aldis Hodge (Leverage), Aron Eisenberg (Star Trek DS9), Bruce Boxleitner (Babylon 5), Christopher Heyerdahl (Hell on Wheels), Christopher Judge (Stargate sg1), Cindy Morgan (TRON), Finn Jones and Miltos Yerolemou (Game of Thrones), Jim Beaver (Supernatural), Mark Pellegrino (Supernatural), Sebastian Roche (Vampire Diaries), Terry Molloy (Classic Doctor Who) and Temuera Morrison (Fresh Meat)

2013
2–3 March Dunedin, The Edgar Centre

Guests included 
animation guest – Greg Cipes (Ben 10: Alien Force, Teen Titans, Teenage Mutant Ninja Turtles). 
Movie guests – Hobbit stars, Dean O'Gorman, Jed Brophy, William Kircher, Peter Hambleton.

9–10 March – Christchurch, The Stables, Addington Raceway

Guests included guest – Dante Basco (Avatar: The Last Airbender, American Dragon: Jake Long, Hook). 
 Movie guests – Hobbit stars, Dean O'Gorman, Jed Brophy, William Kircher, Peter Hambleton.

25–26 May – Hamilton, Claudelands

Guests included 
Animation guest: Yeardley Smith of The Simpsons. TV guest: Mitch Pileggi of The X-Files

1–3 June – Wellington, westpac stadium

Guests include 
Animation – Christopher Smith (Monsuno), Janet Varney (Avatar: The legend of Korra) and Meagan Smith (Ben 10)
Comics – Dean Rankine (Bonzo Comics) and Gail Simone (Batgirl)
TV/Media guests – Yeardley Smith (The Simpsons), Jason Momoa (Game of Thrones), Joe Flanigan (Stargate Atlantis), Lance Henriksen (Aliens) Mitch Pileggi (X-Files) and Tony Amendola(Once Upon A Time)
HOBBIT Cast included – Sylvester McCoy (Radagast the Brown), Luke Evans (Bard the Bowman), Adam Brown (Ori), Aidan Turner (Kili), Dean O'Gorman (Fili), Graham McTavish (Dwalin), James Nesbitt (Bofur), Jed Brophy (Nori), John Callen (Oin), Mark Hadlow (Dori), Peter Hambleton (Gloin), Stephen Hunter (Bombur) and William Kircher(Bifur).

19–20 October – Melbourne Showgrounds

Guests included, 
Acting guests: Mark Rolston, Corey Feldman, Evanna Lynch, Billy Boyd, Ben Browder, Temuera Morrison, Nell Campbell, Gigi Edgley, Dean Stockwell, Dwight Schultz, Claudia Black, Ty Olsson, Ian McNeice, Catrin Stewart, Dan Starkey, Simon Fisher-Becker, Barry Bostwick, Richard Hatch, Robbie Jarvis, Jason Carter, Kim Rhodes, Norman Lovett, Rick Worthy, Tony Amendola. Star Trek production guest: Richard Arnold. Movie screening of Space Milkshake.

25–28 October – Auckland, ASB Showgrounds

Guests included, 
Acting guests: Mark Rolston, Evanna Lynch, Billy Boyd, Ben Browder, Stephen Hunter, John Callen, Gigi Edgley, Dean Stockwell, Dwight Schultz, Ty Olsson, Ian McNeice, Catrin Stewart, Dan Starkey, Simon Fisher-Becker, Barry Bostwick, Robbie Jarvis, Jason Carter, Kim Rhodes, Norman Lovett, Rick Worthy, Tony Amendola. Movie screening of Space Milkshake.

2014
1–2 March – Dunedin, Edgar Centre

Guests included 
Animation Guest: Steve Blum. 
Acting Guests: Colin Baker, Nicola Bryant, Mark Strickson, Mark Hadlow, John Callen.

8–9 March – Christchurch, The Stables, Addington Raceway

Guests included, Animation Guest: Steve Blum. Acting Guests: Colin Baker, Nicola Bryant, Mark Strickson, Mark Hadlow, John Callen.

24–25 May – Hamilton, Claudelands arena

Guests included 
comic guest: Bill Sienkiewicz, Tom Taylor. 
Animation Guests: Paul Eiding (Ben 10), William Salyers (Regular Show), Charles Martinet (Mario Games). 
TV/Movie guests: Michael Rowe (Arrow), Christopher Judge (Stargate SG1), DJ Qualls, James Patrick Stuart, Jake Abel, Samantha Ferris, Steven Williams (Supernatural), John Callen, Mark Hadlow (The Hobbit). J-Pop performer: Chii Sakurabi.

31 May-2 June – Wellington, Westpac Stadium

Guests included, 
Comic guests: Bill Sienkiewicz, Tom Taylor. 
Animation Guests: Paul Eiding (Ben 10), William Salyers (Regular Show), Charles Martinet (Mario Games), Jessica DiCicco (Adventure Time).
TV/Movie guests: Michael Rowe, David Ramsey, Manu Bennett (Arrow), Christopher Judge (Stargate SG1), DJ Qualls, James Patrick Stuart, Jake Abel, Samantha Ferris, Steven Williams (Supernatural), John Callen, Mark Hadlow, Peter Hambleton (The Hobbit), Taika Waititi, Jemaine Clement, Jonny Brugh, Ben Fransham (What We Do in the Shadows), Frazer Hines (Doctor Who). J-Pop performer: Chii Sakurabi.

18–19 October – Melbourne, Melbourne Showgrounds

Guests included, 
Comic Guests: Kevin Eastman, Alan Robinson, Darick Robertson, James Tynion IV, John Layman, Kyle Higgins, Dean Rankine, Wayne Nichols, Adam Nichols. 
Animation Guests: Greg Cipes (Teen Titans), Jason Spisak (Young Justice), Roger Jackson (The Powerpuff Girls), Sean Schemmel(Dragonball Z), William Salyers (The Regular Show). *TV/Movie Guests: Jenna Coleman, Sarah Madison (Doctor Who), AJ Buckley, Travis Wester, Alaina Huffman (Supernatural), Cliff Simon, Peter Williams, Jacqueline Samuda, Suanne Braun, David Hewlett, David Nykl (Stargate), Giancarlo Esposito (Breaking Bad), Helen Slater (Supergirl), Margot Kidder (Superman films), Mira Furlan (Babylon 5), Judson Scott (Star Trek), Michael Hogan (Battlestar Galactica, Teen Wolf), Jim Duggan (WWE), Peter Hambleton (The Hobbit), Matthew J. Doran (The Matrix). Authors: Robert Rankin (British humorous novelist), Terry Brooks (Shannara series)

24–27 October – Auckland, ASB Showgrounds, Greenlane

Guests included, 
Comic Guests: Kevin Eastman, Alan Robinson, Darick Robertson, James Tynion IV, John Layman, Kyle Higgins. 
Animation Guests: Greg Cipes (Teen Titans), Jason Spisak (Young Justice), Roger Jackson (The Powerpuff Girls), Sean Schemmel (Dragonball Z), William Salyers (The Regular Show). * *TV/Movie Guests: Richard Dean Anderson (SG1, MacGyver), Jenna Coleman, Sarah Madison (Doctor Who), AJ Buckley, Travis Wester, DJ Qualls (Supernatural), Cliff Simon, Peter Williams, Jacqueline Samuda, Suanne Braun, David Hewlett, David Nykl (Stargate), Giancarlo Esposito (Breaking Bad), Helen Slater (Supergirl), Mira Furlan (Babylon 5), Judson Scott (Star Trek), Michael Hogan (Battlestar Galactica, Teen Wolf), Jim Duggan (WWE), William Kircher (The Hobbit), Barry Duffield (Spartacus), Jemaine Clement, Jonny Brugh, Cori Gonzalez-Macuer, Stu Rutherford, Jackie Van Beek, Ben Fransham (What We Do in the Shadows), Lucas Till (X-Men). 
Authors: Robert Rankin (British humorous novelist), Terry Brooks (Shannara series).

2015
28 February/1 March – Dunedin, More FM Arena

Guests included, 
Comic Guests – Darick Robertson, Dean Rankine. 
Animation Guests – Eric Stuart (Pokémon). 
TV/Movie Guests – Alaina Huffman (Supernatural), DJ Qualls (Supernatural), Simon Fisher-Becker(Doctor Who).

7–8 March – Christchurch, Horncastle Arena

Guests included, 
Comic Guests – Darick Robertson, Dean Rankine. 
Animation Guests – Eric Stuart (Pokémon), Colleen O'Shaughnessey (Digimon). 
TV/Movie Guests – Karl Urban (Dredd, Star Trek, LOTR), Katee Sackhoff (Battlestar Galactica), Manu Bennett(Arrow, The Hobbit Trilogy), Alaina Huffman (Supernatural), DJ Qualls (Supernatural), Simon Fisher-Becker (Doctor Who), Armin Shimerman (Star Trek: DS9, Buffy the Vampire Slayer), Kitty Swink (Star Trek: DS9), Adam Brown (The Hobbit Trilogy).

14–15 March – Hamilton, Claudelands Arena (4th and last time this event was run in Hamilton).

Guests included, 
Comic Guests – Darick Robertson, Dean Rankine 
Animation Guests – Eric Stuart (Pokémon), Colleen O'Shaughnessey (Digimon)
TV/Movie Guests – Manu Bennett (Arrow, The Hobbit Trilogy), John Rhys-Davies(LOTR, Indiana Jones), Alaina Huffman (Supernatural), Simon Fisher-Becker (Doctor Who), Armin Shimerman (Star Trek: DS9, Buffy the Vampire Slayer), Kitty Swink(Star Trek: DS9), Adam Brown (The Hobbit Trilogy), Graham McTavish (The Hobbit Trilogy, Outlander TV series), Martin Klebba (The Pirates of the Caribbean).

17–19 July – Wellington, Westpac Stadium

Comic Guest – Stephen Bissette (Swamp Thing)
Animation Guests – Courtenay Taylor (Regular Show), Matthew Mercer (Attack on Titan), Veronica Taylor (Pokémon), Joshua Seth (Digimon)
TV/Movie star Guests – Dean Haglund (X-Files), Jed Brophy and William Kircher (The Hobbit), Jim Beaver, Sebastian Roche (Supernatural), Corin Nemec(Stargate SG1), 
Robert Maschio (Scrubs), Karen Gillan (Doctor Who), Rick Mora (Twilight), Saginaw Grant (Lone Ranger)
Wrestling guest – Ted DiBiase (The Million Dollar Man)
Cosplay Guests – Monika Lee and Riddlev

23–26 October – Auckland, ASB Showgrounds

Comic Guest – Christian Gossett (The Red Star), Kevin McGuire (JLI), Zander Cannon(Top 10), Dave Johnson (100 Bullets)
Animation Guests – Christina Vee (Sailor Moon), Chuck Huber (Dragonball Z), Mela Lee (Fate/Stay Night), Hal Rayle (Animation Legend), Maggie Roswell (The Simpsons)
TV/Movie star Guests – Natalia Tena and Keisha Castle-Hughes (Game of Thrones), Alex Heartman and Azim Rizk (Power Rangers), Lou Diamond Phillips (SGU), 
Sean Maher (Serenity), Michael Rowe and Manu Bennett (Arrow), John Wesley Shipp (The Flash), Rachel Miner and Nicki Aycox (Supernatural), 
Casper Van Dien and Dina Meyer (Starship Troopers), Rainbow Sun Francks (Stargate Atlantis), Richard Franklin (Doctor Who), 
Bernie Kophel (Get Smart) and Robert Maschio (Scrubs)
Wrestling guest – Jake 'The Snake' Roberts
Japanese singer – Aimee Blackschleger

2016

5–6 March, Vodafone Events Centre, Manukau Armageddon.
Comic guests: Dean Rankine (Simpsons Comics), Christian Gossett,(The red star), Charles Soule (Letter 44). 
Animation voice actors: William Salyers, Mike McFarland, Paul Eiding.
Cosplay guests: Riki Lecotey and Monika Lee. 
TV and Movie Stars: Richard Dean Anderson, (Stargate SG-1) and (MacGyver), 
Christopher Judge, (Stargate SG-1) and (The dark night rises); Ray Santiago, (Ash VS Evil dead) TV series; Marina Sirtis, (Star Trek Next generation); David Nykl, (Stargate Atlantis); Ruth Connell, (Supernatural) TV series. Wrestling Guest Haku (King Tonga).

12–13 March, Horncastle Arena, Christchurch Armageddon

Comic guests: Christian Gossett,(The red star), Charles Soule (Letter 44). Animation voice actors William Salyers, Mike McFarland, Paul Eiding.
Cosplay guests: Riki Lecotey and Monika Lee. 
TV and Movie Stars: Richard Dean Anderson, (Stargate SG-1) and (MacGyver), 
Christopher Judge, (Stargate SG-1) and (The dark night rises); Marina Sirtis (Star Trek Next generation); David Nykl, (Stargate Atlantis); Ruth Connell, (Supernatural) TV series. Wrestling Guest Haku (King Tonga).

19–20 March, MoreFM Arena, Dunedin Armageddon

Comic guests: Christian Gossett,(The red star), Charles Soule (Letter 44). 
Animation voice actors: William Salyers, Mike McFarland, Paul Eiding.
Cosplay guests: Riki Lecotey and Monika Lee. 
TV and Movie Stars: Christopher Judge, (Stargate SG-1) and (The Dark Knight Rises); Marina Sirtis, (Star Trek Next generation); David Nykl, (Stargate Atlantis); Wrestling Guest Haku (King Tonga).

4–6 June, Westpac stadium, Wellington Armageddon

TV and Movie guests:Rose McIver- (izombie & Once Upon a Time), David Giuntoli (Grimm), Bitsie Tulloch – (Grimm), Natalia Tena (Harry Potter films, Game of Thrones),
Robert Picardo (Star Trek: Voyager, Stargate Atlantis), Samuel Anderson Doctor Who, Ray Santiago (Ash Vs Evil Dead), Dana DeLorenzo Ash Vs Evil Dead, Ted Raimi (Xena, Seaquest DSV), Tahmoh Penikett Supernatural, Dollhouse, Battlestar Galactica; Cliff Simon Stargate sg1; Graham McTavish Outlander, Creed, Hobbit films; 
Wrestling guest The Honky Tonk Man. Cosplay guests (international) Tine Marie Riis (Norway), Eve Beauregard (Australia). Animation guests Stephanie Sheh Sailor Moon, Naruto, Bleach, Eureka seven; Michael Sinterniklaas – Venture Brothers, Teenage mutant ninja turtles; 
Christy Carlson Romano Kim possible. Comic guests Carl Potts Alien Legion, Punisher war journal; Rachael Stott Doctor Who comics, Star Trek/Planet of the Apes; Christian Gossett The Red Star.

2017 

11–12 March, Horncastle Arena, Christchurch

Comic Guests: Tom Taylor (Injustice: Gods Among Us), Colin Wilson (Dredd). With Animation Guests:
Veronica Taylor (Pokémon), Christopher Corey Smith (Lego Batman games), Cindy Robinson (Sailor Moon). Also TV/Movie Guests:
Billy Boyd (Lord of the Rings), Ray Fisher (Justice League), Chad Coleman (The Walking Dead), Miltos Yerolemou (Game of Thrones), Ivana Baquero (Shannara, Pan's Labyrinth).

18–19 March, More FM Arena, Dunedin, 

Comic Guests: Tom Taylor (Injustice: Gods Among Us), Colin Wilson (Dredd)and animation Guests
Veronica Taylor (Pokémon), Christopher Corey Smith (Lego Batman games), Cindy Robinson (Sailor Moon), Hynden Walch (Teen Titans, Adventure Time) along with TV/Movie Guests
Billy Boyd (Lord of the Rings), Ray Fisher (Justice League), Chad Coleman (The Walking Dead), Miltos Yerolemou (Game of Thrones).

28–29 May, Baypark Arena, Tauranga,

Comic guest was Todd Nauck (Spiderman/Deadpool, Young Justice, Doctor Who) along with Animation Guests
Max Mittelman (One Punch Man), Ray Chase (Final Fantasy XV), Robbie Daymond (Sailor Moon Crystal, Final Fantasy XV), Kyle Hebert (Dragon Ball Z, Naruto) and Cosplay Guests
Elffi and Calssara. With TV/Movie Guests
Jewel Staite (Firefly, Serenity, Stargate Atlantis), Matt Letscher (The Flash, Legends of Tomorrow), Franz Drameh (The Flash, Legends of Tomorrow), Richard Harmon (The 100), Sachin Sahel (The 100), Max Carver & Charlie Carver (Teen Wolf), Paul Amos (Lost Girl, Assassin's Creed Syndicate), Adrian Paul (Highlander), Patricia Tallman (Babylon 5).

3 to 5 June, Westpac Stadium, Wellington

Comic guest was Todd Nauck (Spiderman/Deadpool, Young Justice, Doctor Who) with Animation Guests
Max Mittelman (One Punch Man), Ray Chase (Final Fantasy XV), Robbie Daymond (Sailor Moon Crystal, Final Fantasy XV), Kyle Hebert (Dragon Ball Z, Naruto). Cosplay Guests
Elffi, Calssara along with TV/Movie Guests
Mark Sheppard (Supernatural, Firefly), Alaina Huffman (Supernatural, Stargate Universe), Jewel Staite (Firefly, Serenity, Stargate Atlantis), Jeremy Jordan (Supergirl), Matt Letscher (The Flash, Legends of Tomorrow), Franz Drameh (The Flash, Legends of Tomorrow), Richard Harmon (The 100), Sachin Sahel (The 100), Max Carver & Charlie Carver (Teen Wolf), Paul Amos (Lost Girl, Assassin's Creed Syndicate), Adrian Paul (Highlander), Patricia Tallman (Babylon 5), Ivana Baquero (Pan's Labyrinth, Shannara), Andrew Lees (The Originals), John Levene (Classic Doctor Who), Nathalie Boltt (Riverdale).

21–24 October, ASB Showgrounds, Auckland,

Comic Guests were David Lloyd (V For Vendetta), Jill Thompson (Wonder Woman, Scary Godmother), Troy Little (Powerpuff Girls), Brenda Hickey (My Little Pony) along with 
Animation Guests Amber Nash (Archer), Steve Downes, Jen Taylor (Halo), Bryce Papenbrook (Attack on Titan, Sword Art Online), Eric Stuart (Pokémon, Yu-Gi-Oh), John Stocker (Classic Voice Actor and Director). Cosplay Guests were Monika Lee, Jessica Nigri, Ashlynne Dae, Reagan Kathryn. The TV/Movie Guests were
John Barrowman (Doctor Who, Torchwood, Arrow), Tom Felton (Harry Potter, The Flash), Nathan Fillion (Firefly, Castle), Osric Chau (Supernatural), Ricky Whittle (The 100, American Gods), Erica Cerra (The 100), Holland Roden (Teen Wolf), Pom Klementieff (Guardians of the Galaxy 2), Enver Gjokaj (Agent Carter, Dollhouse), Walter Koenig (Star Trek), David Blue (Stargate Universe), Jacqueline Toboni (Grimm).

2018 

30 March to 1 April – Westpac Stadium Wellington

TV movie Guests included Jeremy Renner (Marvel's Avengers (film series)); Bonnie Wright from (Harry Potter (film series)), Matt Ryan (actor), Kim Rhodes, DJ Qualls, Christopher Larkin (actor), Christopher Larkin (actor), Chelsey Reist,
Rahul Kohli, Aly Michalka, Cherami Leigh, 
Animation Lauren Landa, Mike McFarland, David Sobolov, Mick Wingert, 
Ben Fransham, Jonathan Brugh, Al Barrionuevo, Ben Stenbeck, 
cosplayers Jessica Nigri and Ashlynne Dae. Armageddon also again hosted fundraisers for child cancer

26 to 27 May – Tauranga Armageddon, ASB Baypark Stadium

Guests included Comic Guest Sloane Leong, Animation Guests Brad Swaile (Death Note, X-Men Evolution), David Sobolov (Guardians of the Galaxy, The Flash). Cosplay Guest Ashlynne Dae, *TV/Movie Guests, 
Katie McGrath (Supergirl, Merlin), Lauren German & Lesley-Ann Brandt (Lucifer), Paul Blackthorne, Katrina Law, Echo Kellum & David Nykl (Arrow), Daniel Portman (Game of Thrones), John Shea (Lois & Clark), Garrett Wang (Star Trek: Voyager), 
Wrestler'Hacksaw' Jim Duggan (WWE)

2/4 June – Christchurch Armageddon, Horncastle Arena

Guests included Sloane Leong, 
Animation Guests Brad Swaile (Death Note, X-Men Evolution), David Sobolov (Guardians of the Galaxy, The Flash). 
Cosplay Guest Ashlynne Dae, 
TV/Movie Guests, Katie McGrath (Supergirl, Merlin), Mehcad Brooks (supergirl) Lauren German & Lesley-Ann Brandt (Lucifer), Paul Blackthorne, Katrina Law, Echo Kellum & David Nykl (Arrow), Daniel Portman (Game of Thrones), John Shea (Lois & Clark), Garrett Wang (Star Trek: Voyager),
 Wrestling'Hacksaw' Jim Duggan (WWE).

19 to 22 October – Auckland Armageddon, ASB Showgrounds

Comic Guests Eduardo Risso, Stephen B Jones, Jeff Johnson, 
Animation Guests Arryn Zech, Kara Eberle, Elizabeth Maxwell (RWBY), Jason Liebrecht (My Hero Academia), Mark Meer, Belinda Cornish (Mass Effect), Sara Cravens (Injustice 2), Josh Grelle (Yuri on Ice), Yoshinori Asao (Fukushima Gainax) 
Cosplay Guests Jessica Nigri, LeeAnna Vamp, Ashlynne Dae, 
YouTube Guests The Hillywood Show, 
Music Guests Openside, 
TV/Movie Guests Christina Ricci (The Addams Family), Shannen Doherty (Charmed), Michael Shanks (Stargate SG-1), Katie Leung (Harry Potter), Ty Olsson, Osric Chau, Jeffrey Vincent Parise, David Haydn-Jones (Supernatural), Navid Negahban (Legion), Drew Powell (Gotham), Anna Hopkins (Shadowhunters), Jimmy Wong (Mulan 2020), Rhys Darby (Flight of the Conchords), Patricia Tallman (Babylon 5)

2019 
Armageddon expo changes cosplay prop rules after mosque attacks in Christchurch New Zealand, 15 March 2019

13 to 15 April – Wellington Armageddon, Westpac Stadium

Comic Guests Babs Tarr, Andrew Griffith, Ryan K Lindsey. Animation Guests Veronica Taylor (Pokémon, Dragon Ball Super, Sailor Moon), Trina Nishimura (Attack on Titan).
And TV/Movie Guests Nicholas Hoult (X-Men films, Warm Bodies), Tom Welling (Smallville, Lucifer), Amy Acker (The Gifted, Person of Interest, Angel), James Carpinello (Gotham), Julian Richings (Supernatural, 12 Monkeys), Amber Midthunder (Legion, Roswell, New Mexico), Tati Gabrielle, Adeline Rudolph, Abigail Cowen (Chilling Adventures of Sabrina), Aimee Garcia (Lucifer), Ray Wise (Reaper, Twin Peaks), Officers Mike Minogue and Karen O'Leary (Wellington Paranormal).

1 to 3 June – Christchurch Armageddon, Horncastle Arena

Comic Guests Nick Dragotta, Jeff Johnson, Stephen B Jones. Animation Guests Yuri Lowenthal, William Salyers, Tara Platt Spider-Man (2017 TV series).TV/Movie Guests
Katherine McNamara, Luke Baines (Shadowhunters), Tricia Helfer (Lucifer, Battlestar Galactica), Graham McTavish, Lotte Verbeek (Outlander (TV series)), Amber Nash (Archer), Connor Trinneer, Dominic Keating (Star Trek: Voyager), Andrew Matarazzo (Teen Wolf), Officers Mike Minogue and Karen O'Leary (Wellington Paranormal).

8 to 9 June – Tauranga Armageddon, ASB Baypark Stadium

Comic Guests Nick Dragotta, Jeff Johnson, Stephen B Jones. Animation Guests Yuri Lowenthal, William Salyers, Tara Platt (Spider-Man (2017 TV series)).TV/Movie Guests
Katherine McNamara, Luke Baines (Shadowhunters), Tricia Helfer (Lucifer, Battlestar Galactica), Graham McTavish, Lotte Verbeek (Outlander (TV series)), Amber Nash (Archer), Connor Trinneer, Dominic Keating (Star Trek: Voyager), Andrew Matarazzo (Teen Wolf), Officers Mike Minogue and Karen O'Leary (Wellington Paranormal).

25 to 28 October – Auckland Armageddon, ASB Showgrounds

Comic Guests Dean Rankine. Animation Guests Steve Blum, Mary Elizabeth McGlynn (Cowboy Bebop, Star Wars Rebels), Patricia Summersett (Legend of Zelda: Breath of the Wild), Leah Clark (My Hero Academia), Rikki Simons (Invader Zim). Cosplay Guests Yaya Han. YouTube Guests Mega64, Viva La Dirt League. TV/Movie Guests
Jason Isaacs (Harry Potter Films), Jon Heder (Napoleon Dynamite), Sean Gunn (Guardians of the Galaxy), Ruth Connell (Supernatural), Sam Witwer (Battlestar Galactica), Inbar Lavi (Lucifer), Adam Croasdell (Preacher), Jodelle Ferland (Silent Hill), Natalia Cordova-Buckley (Agents of S.H.I.E.L.D.), Gregg Sulkin (Marvel's Runaways), Patricia Tallman (Babylon 5), Paul Amos (Lost Girl), Antonia Prebble (Westside), Wellington Paranormal. Wrestling Guests
Lita, The Honky Tonk Man. E-Sports and Cosplay presence at the Auckland event continues to grow.

Future dates

2020 

10 to 12 April – Wellington Armageddon, Sky Stadium
postponed this event to August 1/2 2020 still at the same venue Sky Stadium.

30 May to 1 June – Christchurch Armageddon, Horncastle Arena

 6 to 7 June – Tauranga Armageddon, Baypark Arena

1 to 2 August – Wellington Armageddon, Sky Stadium

23 to 26 October – Auckland Armageddon, ASB Showgrounds

New Zealand Comic Con

2015– 17–19 July Wellington, New Zealand Armageddon Expo expanded the traditional event by creating a citywide festival called NZ Comic Con.  Armageddon Expo is running for three full days but incorporated these additional elements throughout the weekend and evenings. A 3-day Scavenger Hunt, Pub Crawls, quiz nights, art exhibitions, a house of horrors, cosplay photoshoots, opening party and a closing party.  The event was very successful and provided for a full 96 hours of almost non-stop entertainment.

2016 – 4 to 6 June – Wellington, New Zealand citywide events include a 3-day Scavenger hunt; Pub quiz night art exhibitions. House of horrors. Cosplay photo shoots. Opening party and shindig party. Art master class
Studio Ghibli screenings. 
Wellycon. Au Contraire. Wellington Zinefest.

2017 – 3 to 5 June NZCC returned to wellington for another fun fill four days for geeks to enjoy being themselves

NZ Anime Convention (Dunedin Anime Experience)
NZ Anime Convention (also known as the Dunedin Anime Experience) was a commercial anime and manga convention held in Dunedin, New Zealand. It was first held in 2009 in a growing response to include Dunedin into the Armageddon Expo family. The first event was held in the Dunedin Town Hall and from 2010 onwards at Castle Lecture Complex in the University of Otago. This event ceased after two years and was replaced by the Armageddon Expo Dunedin Show in 2012.

References

External links
 
 Beyond Reality Media official site

Comics conventions
Anime conventions in New Zealand
Science fiction conventions in New Zealand